"Big Man" is a song by electronic duo Chase & Status featuring vocals from British singer Liam Bailey. The track was released in the United Kingdom as a promotional download on 16 October 2012, both for free and on retailers. The song managed to enter the UK Singles Chart at number 68 and the UK Dance Chart at number thirteen. Although an independent release, the song features as the American bonus track of their 2013 album Brand New Machine.

Track listing

Chart performance

Release history

References

2012 singles
2012 songs
Chase & Status songs
Songs written by Saul Milton
Songs written by Will Kennard